Michael Devaney (born 29 November 1984 in Dublin) is an Irish racing driver.

Career overview 
Michael Devaney has been racing since 1997 when he had a successful stint in the Irish Junior Karting Championship winning the All-Ireland and National Championships. He moved into Irish Formula Ford Championship in 2001 aged 16 winning many races, he then moved on to German Formula BMW in 2002 and won in just his second racahead of Nico Rosberg. Devaney moved up to German Formula 3 in 2004 and became Ireland's youngest ever Formula 3 race winner, in 2005 he fought for the championship and finished 2nd overall despite missing the first two races due to lack of funding. The Dublin man then became the driver for A1 Team Ireland in the A1 Grand Prix series for the 2006–07 season after some strong showings in 2005 while substituting for Ralph Firman Jnr.

After leaving his drive with Team Ireland, Devaney signed for newly formed Ultimate Motorsport to compete in the International British Formula 3 Championship with new Formula 3 constructor Mygale. He took the team's first two victories thanks to a double win at Snetterton. He is currently without a drive after Ultimate pulled out of British F3.

Awards

Michael Devaney has won the following awards during his short time in motorsport:
 Irish karting ‘Rookie of the Year’ 1997
 Motorsport Ireland Young Racing Driver of the Year 2001
 Motorsport Ireland Young Racing Driver of the Year 2002

He has also achieved:
 Winner of IRL Plate (1999)
 Irish National Junior Karting Champion (2000)
 2 race wins in the Irish Formula Ford Zetec Championship (2001)
 4 race wins total in German Formula BMW (2002 & 2003)
 7 race wins total in the German F3 Championship (2004 & 2005)
 Runner-up in the 2005 German F3 Championship
 First ever victories for French constructor Mygale in Formula 3. (2008)
 First ever race car victory for Ultimate Motorsport(Snetterton, British F3(2008)

Racing career

Complete A1 Grand Prix results
(key) (Races in bold indicate pole position) (Races in italics indicate fastest lap)

Complete Formula 3 Euro Series record
(key)

External links
Michael Devaney's Official Website
Michael Devaney career statistics at Driver Database

1984 births
Living people
A1 Team Ireland drivers
German Formula Three Championship drivers
British Formula Three Championship drivers
Irish racing drivers
Formula BMW ADAC drivers
Formula 3 Euro Series drivers
Porsche Carrera Cup GB drivers
Status Grand Prix drivers
A1 Grand Prix drivers
Team Rosberg drivers